AcousticBrainz was a free and open source project that aimed to crowd source acoustic information from digital music under an open license. It was a MetaBrainz Foundation project tied to MusicBrainz.

AcousticBrainz had both CLI and GUI clients that could scan music libraries and submit the resulting acoustic data to the AcousticBrainz database. While it was possible to compile the client, the project preferred usage of a binary. From this acoustic data, AcousticBrainz automatically generated information like BPM, key, and timbre. This information was used to study trends in popular music.

The project was discontinued on February 16, 2022, after 7 years of service, with focus being moved to the newer ListenBrainz project.

References

 
Free-content websites